Sanjianfang Area is an area and township in the eastern Chaoyang District and around the 5th Ring Road of Beijing, China. It borders Pingfang and Changying Townships to the north, Guanzhuang Township to the east, Dougezhuang Township to the south, and Gaobeidian Township to the west. It has a population of 109,672 according to the 2020 Chinese census.

The name Sanjianfang is derived from Sanjiafang, which were a collection of prominent workshops and markets within the area around the end of Ming dynasty.

History

Administrative Divisions 
In 2021, the township is divided into 26 subdivisions, including 15 communities and 11 villages:

See also 
 List of township-level divisions of Beijing

References

Chaoyang District, Beijing
Areas of Beijing